The DK was a Danish automobile built as a prototype by S. A. Mathiesen in 1950.  It was supposed to combine American comfort with European dimensions and economy.  It featured a chassisless aluminum body, a Heinkel engine and a ZF Friedrichshafen gearbox.  It remained a prototype, but in 1953 a new, modified version was introduced as the DKR car.  A few dozen were built, until 1954.

References

External links 

 http://www.gtue-oldtimerservice.de

Vehicles of Denmark